The 2007–08 Iraqi Premier League season started on 26 November 2007 and ended on 24 August 2008. The season saw Erbil crowned as champions for the second time in a row, beating Al-Zawraa 1–0 after extra time in the final.

For security reasons, the league was divided into three groups: South, North and Central. The top six clubs from the Central Group and the top four clubs from the North and South Groups qualified for the Elite Stage. The Elite Stage consisted of three groups, of which the winners and one runner-up qualified for the Golden Stage, a knockout contest. The Golden Stage matches were held at Al-Shaab Stadium in Baghdad.

The champions and runners-up qualified for the 2009 AFC Cup, while third-placed Al-Quwa Al-Jawiya qualified for the 2008–09 Arab Champions League.

New rule
The Iraq Football Association introduced a new rule that allowed clubs to make four substitutions instead of three.

Group stage

North Group

Note: Al-Mosul withdrew from the league.

Results

Central Group

Results

South Group

Results

Elite stage

Group 1

Group 2

Group 3

Semi-final playoff

Golden stage

Semi-finals

Third place match

Final 

Match officials
Assistant referees:
Hussein Turki
Mohammed Arab
Fourth official:
Kadhim Awda

Match rules
90 minutes.
30 minutes of extra-time if necessary.
Penalty shootout if scores still level.

Final positions

Season statistics

Top scorers

Hat-tricks 

Notes
4 Player scored 4 goals

Awards
 Top scorer: Asaad Abdul-Nabi (Al-Kahrabaa)
 Best Player/MVP: Ahmad Ayad (Al-Quwa Al-Jawiya)
 Best Coach: Radhi Shenaishil (Al-Zawraa)

References

External links
 Iraq Football Association

Iraqi Premier League seasons
1
Iraq